Selin Demiratar (born 20 March 1983) is a Turkish actress.

Biography 
Selin Demiratar was born in 1983 in Erzincan. She first explored acting at the Antalya Municipal Theatre.

In 1999, she won the Miss Globe Turkey beauty pageant and finished in third place at Miss Globe World. After moving to Istanbul, she started her professional acting career with a role in the series 90-60-90. She became popular in Turkey following her appearance in Acı Hayat.

Filmography

References

External links
 
 

1983 births
Living people
Actresses from Istanbul
Turkish film actresses
Turkish stage actresses
Turkish television actresses